Rytel is a PKP railway station in Rytel (Pomeranian Voivodeship), Poland.

Lines crossing the station

Train services
The station is served by the following service(s):

Regional services (R) Chojnice - Czarna Woda - Starogard Gdanski - Tczew

References 

Rytel article at Polish Stations Database, URL accessed at 7 March 2006

Railway stations in Pomeranian Voivodeship
Chojnice County